Dax or DAX may refer to:

Business and organizations
 DAX, stock market index of the top 40 German companies
 DAX 100, an expanded index of 100 stocks, superseded by the HDAX
 TecDAX, stock index of the top 30 German technology firms
 Dax Cars, British sports car manufacturer
 Honda Dax, a motorcycle model
 US Dax, a rugby union club based in France

People

People with the given name
 Dax Cowart (born 1947), American attorney
 Dax Dellenbach (born 1990), American football player
 Dax ExclamationPoint, American drag queen
 Dax Griffin (born 1972), American actor
 Dax Harwood (born 1984), American professional wrestler
 Dax Holdren (born 1972), American beach volleyball player
 Dax McCarty (born 1987), American soccer player
 Dax Milne (born 1999), American football player
 Dax O'Callaghan (born 1986), English singer, dancer and actor
 Dax Reynosa (born 1969/1970), American hip hop artist and producer and smooth jazz musician
 Dax Phelan (born 1975), American screenwriter, producer, and director,
 Dax Pierson (born 1970), American musician
 Dax Riggs (born 1973), lyricist and vocalist for the Louisiana metal band Acid Bath
 Dax Shepard (born 1975), American actor
 Dax (rapper) (born 1994), stagename of Nigerian Canadian rapper Daniel Nwosu Jr.
 Dax, nickname for Davide Cesare (1977–2003), Italian antifascist activist
 Mr. DAX, nickname for Dirk Müller, German stock trader

People with the surname
 Elsa Dax (born 1972), French visual artist
 Eric Cunningham Dax (1908 – 2008), Australian psychiatrist
 Danielle Dax (born 1958), British musician
 Guiraude de Dax (c. 1100 – c. 1130), Gascon heiress
 Marc Dax (1770–1837), French neurologist

Fictional characters
 Dax (Power Rangers), character in Power Rangers Operation Overdrive
 Dax (Star Trek), character from the television show Star Trek: Deep Space Nine
 "Dax", an episode of Star Trek: Deep Space Nine
 Dax Xenos, a character in the Harold Robbins novel The Adventurers, later adapted into a film also titled The Adventurers 
 Colonel Dax, character in the film Paths of Glory
 Dax, character on The Philanthropist
 Dax, one of Haviland Tuf's cats in the series Tuf Voyaging, first seen in "Guardians"

Places
 Arrondissement of Dax, an arrondissement of the Landes département of France
 Canton of Dax-1, or Canton de Dax Nord, a subdivision of the arrondissement
 Canton of Dax-2, or Canton de Dax Sud, a subdivision of the arrondissement
 Dax, Landes, a town in France
 Dax Cathedral, cathedral in the town 
 Dazhou Heshi Airport (IATA code), China

Science and technology
 DAX or Data analysis expressions, a query language used by Microsoft software products
 DAX (application), a film and television production workflow application
 Microsoft Dynamics AX, an enterprise resource planning software

Other uses
 Dax (rapper), stage name of Canadian rapper, singer, and songwriter Daniel Nwosu
 DAX, the main German stock market index
 Dax (typeface), a sans-serif typeface designed by Hans Reichel
 Dax Riders, French techno/synth-funk band funded by Oliver Dax
 Daxophone, a musical instrument invented by Hans Reichel

See also
 DAX1, a protein involved in sex determination
 DACS (disambiguation)
 Daxter, a fictional character